Robert Crawford (1 October 1869 – 27 February 1917) was an English cricketer. He played one first-class match for Cambridge University Cricket Club in 1891.

See also
 List of Cambridge University Cricket Club players

References

External links
 

1869 births
1917 deaths
English cricketers
Cambridge University cricketers
Sportspeople from Bedford